Highway 20 is a major road intended for travel by the public between Highway 11 Lumsden to Highway 3 at Birch Hills. Saskatchewan's main roadways are located in the central/southern geographical land area of rolling prairie and grass land in a western Canadian prairie province. This highway is one which runs south to north and is located just east of Saskatoon and just north of Regina. At the northern extremity near Lanigan, the highway helps to service the PCS Lanigan potash mining operation.  Down south, the highway is popular for tourists heading out to the Qu'Appelle Valley and resorts and beaches of Last Mountain Lake.

History
On September 26, 2000  Highway 20 saw construction in resurfacing the highway for 6.6 km just north of Lanigan
June 20, 2001, another resurfacing project resulted in improvements to a 12.9 km section of Highway 20 just north of Guernsey.  It was just north of the Highway 16 junction, and northward and cost an estimated  $800,000.

Major Attractions
Along Highway 20 these are a listing of lakes, big things, statues, historical markers, beaches, historical sites and buildings, national, regional and provincial parks.
20 Feet (6.1 Metres) high  Whooping Crane named Walter was built April 1987 by the side of Highway 20 near Govan
Middle Lake, the smallest of three lakes near Middle Lake
Lucien Lake Regional Park near Middle Lake
Last Mountain House Provincial Park
Last Mountain Regional Park
Last Mountain Lake - Regina Beach, Saskatchewan Beach 11 km NW of Craven, Lumsden Beach
River Park regional park and Campground  near Lumsden.
Craven World Campground near Craven  which hosts the annual summer Craven Country Jamboree
Humboldt & District Museum and Art Gallery and Humboldt Historic Water Tower
Strasbourg Station railway station has been refurbished into the museum.

Trivia
1925 Saskatchewan Wheat Pool Elevator No. 1 opened at Bulyea junction
June 1963, the European-based Alwinsal Corporation of Canada established near Lanigan now known as Potash Corporation of Saskatchewan

Major intersections
From south to north:

References

External links 

020
Humboldt, Saskatchewan